Covenant Canadian Reformed School is a K-12 private Christian school in Neerlandia, Alberta, Canada.

References

External links
 

High schools in Alberta
Middle schools in Alberta
Elementary schools in Alberta
Private schools in Alberta
Christian schools in Canada
Educational institutions in Canada with year of establishment missing